Donald Edmond Wahlberg Jr. (born August 17, 1969) is an American singer, songwriter,  actor, record producer, and film producer. He is a founding member of the boy band New Kids on the Block. Outside music, he has had roles in the Saw films, Zookeeper, Dreamcatcher, The Sixth Sense, Righteous Kill, and Ransom, as well as appearing in the World War II miniseries Band of Brothers as Carwood Lipton.

From 2002 to 2003, he starred in the crime drama Boomtown. He has starred in the drama series Blue Bloods as Danny Reagan since 2010, and since 2014 is an executive producer of the TNT reality television show Boston's Finest. He was nominated for Choice Scream at the 2006 Teen Choice Awards for his work in the Saw films. He has also produced and starred in Rock This Boat, Donnie Loves Jenny and Return of the Mac on Pop TV. He also produced and starred in Wahlburgers on A&E TV.

He is the brother of rapper-actor Mark Wahlberg.

Early life
Wahlberg was born in the Dorchester neighborhood of Boston. He is the eighth of nine children, with older siblings, Arthur, Jim, Paul, Robert, Tracey, Michelle,  Debbie and younger brother, Mark, who began his entertainment career formerly as the leader of the early 1990s boy band, New Kids on the Block. He also has three half-siblings from his father's first marriage: Donna, Scott and Buddy. His mother, Alma Elaine (née Donnelly), was a bank clerk and nurse's aide who died on April 19, 2021, and his father, Donald Edmond Wahlberg Sr., was a teamster who worked as a delivery driver; they divorced in 1982. His father was of Swedish and Irish descent, and his mother was of Irish, English, and French-Canadian ancestry.

Career

New Kids on the Block

As a recording artist, Wahlberg is known as an original member of the boy band New Kids on the Block.

Acting career
Wahlberg's first film acting role was in the 1996 film Bullet with Mickey Rourke and Tupac Shakur. Also in 1996, he appeared as a kidnapper in Ransom with Mel Gibson. He went back to his home town for a starring role in the South Boston-based film Southie. Wahlberg received attention for his role in the 1999 film The Sixth Sense, playing the patient of Bruce Willis' character in the opening sequence.

In 2001, Wahlberg co-starred as Second Lieutenant C. Carwood Lipton in the television miniseries Band of Brothers. He also starred in the 2002–2003 NBC drama series Boomtown as Joel Stevens, a Los Angeles police detective. Graham Yost, executive producer and writer of Boomtown, had worked with him in Band of Brothers and was so impressed by his performance that he wrote the role of Joel Stevens specifically for him.

In 2003, Wahlberg starred alongside Timothy Olyphant, Jason Lee, and his Band of Brothers co-star Damian Lewis as the mentally challenged Duddits in William Goldman and Lawrence Kasdan's adaptation of the Stephen King alien-invasion thriller, Dreamcatcher. In 2005, he starred as Detective Eric Matthews in the second installment of the Saw series. He reprised the role in Saw III in 2006 and Saw IV in 2007, also appearing in Saw V in 2008 via archive footage from the previous films.

In 2006, Wahlberg played Lieutenant Commander Burton in the military/boxing drama Annapolis. In September 2006, he played the lead role in the short-lived television drama Runaway on The CW. The show was cancelled in October 2006 due to poor ratings. In 2007, he starred in the television film Kings of South Beach on A&E. Also in 2007, he starred on the TV series The Kill Point.

In 2008, Wahlberg appeared in Righteous Kill and co-starred in What Doesn't Kill You.

Wahlberg stars as 1st Grade Detective Danny Reagan on CBS's Blue Bloods, a police drama set in New York City.

, Wahlberg is the host of an internet radio show on Friday nights at 8 pm PST called "DDUB's R&B Back Rub" on Cherry Tree Radio and appeared in the 2011 comedy Zookeeper.

Wahlberg is the current host of HLN's "Very Scary People".

In 2021, Wahlberg worked on season five of The Masked Singer as the rooster "Cluedle-Doo" who gave exclusive clues to the viewers. After performing Mark Morrison's "Return of the Mack" in the semi-finals, Wahlberg was unmasked. He even stuck around when Omarion was unmasked as the wildcard contestant "Yeti".

Personal life
In 1991, Wahlberg was charged with first-degree arson for setting a fire at the historic Seelbach Hotel in Louisville, Kentucky. Authorities stated that Wahlberg, then known as the "bad boy" of boy band New Kids on the Block, was partying with fellow band member Danny Wood and fans in the early morning hours when Wahlberg dumped vodka on a hallway carpet and ignited it. Wahlberg was facing up to twenty years in prison, but the charge was later reduced to misdemeanor criminal mischief, and eventually dismissed after Wahlberg agreed to appear in public-service videos addressing fire safety, drug abuse, and drunk driving.

Wahlberg married Kimberly Fey on August 20, 1999, with whom he has two sons. They filed for divorce on August 13, 2008, citing irreconcilable differences. In July 2013, it was reported by Us Weekly that he was dating actress Jenny McCarthy after meeting on Watch What Happens Live in March. They announced their engagement on The View on April 16, 2014, and wed on August 31, 2014, at the Hotel Baker in St. Charles, Illinois.

Wahlberg is a fan of the Boston Celtics and has been seen attending many of their games. He narrated The Association: Boston Celtics, a documentary about the team's 2010 season, and co-narrated, alongside Ice Cube, the ESPN 30 for 30 documentary Celtics/Lakers: Best of Enemies, about the Celtics' rivalry with the Los Angeles Lakers. He co-owns a line of restaurants, Wahlburgers, located in Boston, MA and St. Charles, IL with brothers Paul and Mark.

Politics
In February 2016, Wahlberg endorsed Republican candidate Marco Rubio for president of the United States, but later said the decision had been "tough" because "we have a lot of things we don't agree on." On the prospect of Donald Trump as president, he commented, "We can blame the president, we can blame the government, but we also have to look at ourselves if we vote with emotion, which we're on the verge of doing again collectively, the angry vote is what is moving the meters right now."

Discography

New Kids on the Block albums
 New Kids on the Block (1986)
 Hangin' Tough (1988)
 Step by Step (1990)
 Face the Music (1994)
 The Block (2008)
 10 (2013)
 Thankful (EP) (2017)

Solo
 "The Right Combination" — duet with Seiko Matsuda (1990)

Filmography

Film

Television

Video games

References

External links

 
 
 Donnie Wahlberg's Wife WIKI

1969 births
Living people
20th-century American male actors
20th-century American singers
21st-century American male actors
21st-century American rappers
21st-century American singers
American film producers
American hip hop record producers
American hip hop singers
American male film actors
American male pop singers
American male rappers
American male singers
American male television actors
American people of English descent
American people of French-Canadian descent
American people of Irish descent
American people of Scandinavian descent
American people of Swedish descent
Male actors from Boston
Musicians from Boston
New Kids on the Block members
NKOTBSB members
Participants in American reality television series
People from Dorchester, Massachusetts
Rappers from Boston
Record producers from Massachusetts
Singers from Massachusetts
Donnie